Sálin hans Jóns míns (literally The Soul of Jón) is an Icelandic folklore legend.

References

Icelandic folklore